Miguel Marques Baptista (born 10 September 1993 in Alcobaça) is a Portuguese footballer who plays for Marinhense as a midfielder/striker.

Career

Eastbourne Borough
Baptista made his Borough debut on the 8 August 2015 on the first day of the season against Maidenhead United and played the full 90 minutes, Borough lost 2–1. He scored his first goal for the club on the 12 September against Basingstoke in a 5–1 win.

In late February 2016, Baptista was loaned out to Lewes for a month.

References

External links

1993 births
Living people
People from Alcobaça, Portugal
Portuguese footballers
Association football midfielders
Primeira Liga players
U.D. Leiria players
G.C. Alcobaça players
A.D. Nogueirense players
Eastbourne Borough F.C. players
Lewes F.C. players
F.C. Pedras Rubras players
C.D. Cinfães players
S.C. Espinho players
Amarante F.C. players
S.C. Salgueiros players
A.C. Marinhense players
Portuguese expatriate footballers
Expatriate footballers in England
Portuguese expatriate sportspeople in England
Sportspeople from Leiria District